Pareherwenemef (Pre-hir-wonmef, Prehirwenemef, Rehirwenemef ) was an ancient Egyptian prince of the Nineteenth Dynasty of Egypt, the third son of Pharaoh Ramesses II, the second by Queen Nefertari.

Family

Pareherwenemef was a son of Pharaoh Ramesses II and Queen Nefertari. Prince Amunherkhepeshef is an older brother. Younger brothers include Meryre and Meryatum. The Princesses Henuttawy, Meritamen and Nebettawy were his sisters.

Life
Pareherwenemef was present at the Battle of Kadesh and is depicted in the Abu Simbel temple. In the Kadesh inscriptions an incident is mentioned where two Hittite spies are captured. The interrogation reveals that the enemy is much closer than previously thought. The royal family quickly fled to the west, away from danger, led by Prince Pareherwenemef. The prince was called "First Brave of the Army" and later became "Superintendent of the Horse". Eventually Pareherwenemef became First Charioteer of His Majesty, a position he shared with his brother Mentu-her-khepeshef.

Pareherwenemef is depicted on the facade of the small temple at Abu Simbel. He also appears on the palace facade in the Ramesseum. A statue base form Karnak mentions Pareherwenemef. On that same base a woman named Wadjyt-khati is mentioned but her exact relation to the prince is not known.

He predeceased his elder brother Amunherkhepeshef and elder half-brother Ramesses, because after their death the next crown prince was the fourth son, Khaemwaset.

See also
 List of children of Ramesses II

References

External links
 Pareherwenemef, a son of Ramesses II

Ancient Egyptian princes
People of the Nineteenth Dynasty of Egypt
Ramesses II
Children of Ramesses II